The Palace Theatre & Grand Hall Complex is a mutli-purpose entertainment arena complex in Kilmarnock, which was originally opened as a corn exchange in 1863 and converted to a theatre in 1903. The red-sandstone Italianate tower, by James Ingram, dominates the cross at London Road and Green Street.

The building is A-Listed and was one of James Ingram's finest designs in Kilmarnock

In popular culture

British glam rock band The Sweet wrote their song "The Ballroom Blitz" about a concern they were performing at the Palace Theatre and Grand Hall when they were bottled off the stage during a performance in January 1973.

Notable events

 In 2022, the Grand Hall hosted the 2022 BBC New Comedy Award.

References

External links

Theatres in Kilmarnock
Buildings and structures in Kilmarnock
Category A listed buildings in East Ayrshire